Debbie Douglas may refer to:
Debbie Douglas (The Only Way Is Essex)
Debbie Douglas (Freakazoid!)